Yunganastes ashkapara is a species of frog in the family Strabomantidae. It is endemic to Bolivia and is known from the vicinity of its type locality in the Chapare Province (northern Cochabamba Department) and from Abra de la Cruz in the Manuel María Caballero Province (western Santa Cruz Department). The specific name ashkapara is derived from Quechuan ashka meaning "a lot" and para for "rain", and refers to the very high rainfall in the region of the type locality.

Description
Two adult males in the type series measure  in snout–vent length (females are unknown). The head is narrower than the body; the snout is rounded. The tympanum is ovoid and the membrane is barely differentiated. The supra-tympanic fold is low and not obscuring the tympanum. The canthus rostralis is sharp. Neither fingers nor toes have webbing but the toes have weakly defined lateral fringes. The outer fingers have expanded discs; the toe discs are almost as large as these. Dorsal skin is shagreened. There is a prominent pair of dorsolateral folds. The dorsum is brown and has some darker markings. There is a dark brown canthal and supra-tympanic stripe. The upper lip has irregular brown blotches. The venter is cream, bearing some brown spots and blotches. Males have a large vocal sac.

The male advertisement call is a short, single note that sounds like a "clack", as if two hard wooden sticks were beaten together.

Habitat and conservation
Natural habitat of Yunganastes ashkapara is tropical moist montane forest. The forest at the type locality is very rich in epiphytes.

This species is potentially threatened by habitat loss (logging). The type locality is within the Carrasco National Park.

References

ashkapara
Amphibians of the Andes
Amphibians of Bolivia
Endemic fauna of Bolivia
Amphibians described in 2000
Taxa named by Jörn Köhler
Taxonomy articles created by Polbot